The Walker Family Plot is a historic cemetery on East Rock Road in Fayetteville, Arkansas.  Located just east of the Fayetteville Confederate Cemetery, this small cemetery stands ringed by a low wrought iron fence.  It is the burial site of many members of the locally prominent Walker family, with burials dating to 1838.  Its most notable burial is that of David Walker (d. 1879), a lawyer, judge, and leading political figure and landowner of the region.

The cemetery was listed on the National Register of Historic Places in 2012.

See also
 National Register of Historic Places listings in Washington County, Arkansas

References

Cemeteries on the National Register of Historic Places in Arkansas
Protected areas of Washington County, Arkansas
National Register of Historic Places in Fayetteville, Arkansas
1838 establishments in Arkansas
Cemeteries established in the 1830s